Chiweta is an area in Rumphi District, Malawi. It is located north of Rumphi. Politically, it falls within the north constituency. It has a number of villages and each village is managed by a village headman. It is undeveloped area with a high proportion of inhabitants doing small businesses. The majority of local villagers earn their living by fishing and subsistence farming. Chiweta has an estimate population of 45,000 people. The area is within the bound of (M1) Mzuzu Karonga road. The nearby area of Livingstonia is located 19 km away from Chiweta. To the east of chiweta is the boundary with the beautiful Lake Malawi.chiweta covers three important coal mines namely, chombe(rukuru coal mine), mnchenga coal mine and kaziwiziwi. Info provided by fedson mwadala about chombe shows that Rukuru commenced it's coal exploration in 2014 and mining in 2017 and most of the coal mines use room and pillar method of mining

Geography of Malawi
Geography of Northern Region, Malawi

Places